John Carr may refer to:

Politicians
John Carr (Indiana politician) (1793–1845), American politician from Indiana
John Carr (Australian politician, born 1819) (1819–1913), member of the South Australian House of Assembly, 1865–1884
John H. Carr (1849–?), member of the Arkansas House of Representatives 
John Carr (Australian politician, born 1871) (1871–1929), unionist and member of the South Australian Legislative Council, 1915–1929
John W. Carr (1874–1932), American politician from North Dakota
John Carr, pseudonym of L. E. Katterfeld (1881–1974), American socialist
John C. Carr (mayor) (1891/2–1967), mayor of Medford, Massachusetts
John B. Carr (1906–1969), Massachusetts state politician

Sportspeople
Johnny Carr (1887–?), American baseball player
John Carr (cricketer, born 1892) (1892–1963), English cricketer and British Army officer
John Carr (cricketer, born 1963), English cricketer and cricket administrator
Cornelius Carr (John Thomas Carr, born 1969), English boxer

Writers and editors
John Carr (writer, born 1722) (1722–1807), British schoolmaster and writer
Sir John Carr (travel writer) (1772–1832), English barrister and travel writer
John Dickson Carr (1906–1977), American author of detective stories
John C. Carr (editor) (1929–1999), American editor
John F. Carr (born 1944), American book editor

Others
John Carr (merchant), 16th-century English merchant and founder of Queen Elizabeth's Hospital School, Bristol
John Carr (architect) (1723–1807), English architect
John Carr (Medal of Honor) (1847–1891), decorated for action during the American Indian Wars
Walter Carr (physician) (John Walter Carr, 1862–1942), British physician and surgeon
John Carr (Irish trade unionist) (born 1945/46), Irish trade union leader
John Carr (military lawyer), American prosecutor at the Guantanamo Bay detainment camp
John Carr, a.k.a. Oliver Stone, a fictional character created by David Baldacci, a member of the Camel Club

See also
Jack Carr (disambiguation)